Moore Potato House is a historic potato house located near Laurel, Sussex County, Delaware. It one of the last surviving examples of its building type. It was built about 1920, and is a -story, gable fronted, balloon frame structure. It retains a number of important elements characteristic of potato house including: tall and narrow proportions, triple siding, minimal fenestration, tightly fitting window hatches, and interior ventilation features (especially the slated floor).

It was placed on the National Register of Historic Places in 1990.

References

Agricultural buildings and structures on the National Register of Historic Places in Delaware
Government buildings completed in 1920
Buildings and structures in Sussex County, Delaware
Potato houses in Delaware
Laurel, Delaware
National Register of Historic Places in Sussex County, Delaware